The Aprilia RSV4 is a super bike manufactured by Aprilia. The RSV4 is Aprilia's flagship model. Aprilia offers two models of the bike: the RSV4 Factory and RSV4  R limited edition (only 350). For 2016 it  is offered in two models the RSV4  RR and RSV4  RF. The 2016 updated bike was made to take advantage of and comply with that year's Superbike rules which allow fewer modifications for production bikes. It has more power, is lighter, and has improved handling and electronics.

Production of the motorcycle began in 2008. The motorcycle was unveiled on 22 February 2008, at the International Piaggio Group Convention in Milan, Italy. It is powered by a 65-degree  V-4 engine, the company's first production four-cylinder engine.

Aprilia launched the bike to race in the 2009 Superbike World Championship season.

Racing

In 2009, its first full season of World Superbike racing, Max Biaggi aboard the RSV4 reached the podium nine times, and won one race at the Brno Circuit.  Aprilia factory teammate Shinya Nakano ended the season in 14th place.

Biaggi won the championship in 2010, and was contracted to race the bike for another two seasons, citing his positive experience with the team and development of the bike into a successful racer and, despite his age, wanting to continue with the momentum they had built up. Max Biaggi ended his career winning the 2012 title with the RSV4.

The Aprilia RSV4 is available as a customer-specified race bike from the factory as a Max Biaggi replica.

Sylvain Guintoli won the 2014 Superbike World Championship season riding an RSV4 for the factory Aprilia racing team. Lorenzo Savadori won the 2015 FIM Superstock 1000 Cup season.

A bike based on the RSV4 was used by Aspar Team and Paul Bird Motorsports, coming 4th in both the 2012 and 2013 Grand Prix motorcycle racing seasons.

References

External links 
 
 RSV4 website
 Aprilia RSV at the Open Directory Project

RSV4
Motorcycles introduced in 2009
Sport bikes